Dionysos is a 1984 French comedy film directed by Jean Rouch, starring Jean Monod and Hélène Puiseux. It tells the story of an American drama teacher who after writing a thesis on Dionysus tries to combine Dionysian rites with the work at a car factory, in an attempt to create the world's first car built in joyous frenzy. The film competed at the 41st Venice International Film Festival. It was released in France on 3 December 1986.

Cast
 Jean Monod as Hugh Gray
 Hélène Puiseux as Ariane
 Cookie Chiapalone as one of three maenads
 Fifi Niane Raliatou as one of three maenads
 Kagumi Onodera as one of three maenads
 Germaine Dieterlen as member of the teachers' choir
 Roger Foucher as member of the teachers' choir
 Enrico Fulchignoni as member of the teachers' choir

Reception
Harlan Kennedy of American Cinema Papers described the film as "entirely lunatic" in his report from Venice, and wrote: "It's like a 60s hippy charging round the icon-scape of 80s Capitalism with a Super-8 camera and hoping meaning will accrue from the whir of disconnected imagery."

References

External links
 
 Catalogue entry at the production company's website 

1984 comedy films
1984 films
Cult of Dionysus
Films about automobiles
Films directed by Jean Rouch
French comedy films
1980s French-language films
Films about neopaganism
Greek and Roman deities in fiction
1980s English-language films
1984 multilingual films
French multilingual films
1980s French films